St. Michael's Church, also known as St. Michael's Chapel and Hannah More Chapel, is a historic Episcopal Church located at Academy Lane and Reisterstown Road in Reisterstown, Baltimore County, Maryland. It is a small, Carpenter Gothic-style, board and batten frame structure, featuring a simple bell-gable. It was designed by New York architect John W. Priest (1825-1859), and constructed about 1853. It was named after Hannah More.  It was deconsecrated on May 12, 1978.

It was listed on the National Register of Historic Places in 1979.

Still owned by the Diocese of Maryland, a renovation project costing $1.2 million began in January 2003. On September 8, 2004, a ribbon-cutting ceremony was held for its reopening. The project included the replacement of roof shingles, a restoration of the interior, which had been destroyed by rainwater, and the removal of chimney bricks.

Gallery

References

External links

, including photo from 2003, at Maryland Historical Trust
 All Saints' Episcopal Church history webpage

Episcopal church buildings in Maryland
Churches in Baltimore County, Maryland
Churches on the National Register of Historic Places in Maryland
Churches completed in 1853
Carpenter Gothic church buildings in Maryland
Reisterstown, Maryland
19th-century Episcopal church buildings
National Register of Historic Places in Baltimore County, Maryland